John Thomas Grange (January 30, 1837 – April 20, 1924) was an Ontario merchant and political figure. He represented Lennox in the Legislative Assembly of Ontario as a Conservative member from 1871 to 1879.

The son of William Grange, he was born in Napanee, Ontario in 1837. Grange served on the town council and was reeve of Napanee. In 1857, he married Jane Ann Scales. Grange ran unsuccessfully for a seat in the Canadian House of Commons in 1867.  He died in 1924.

References

External links

1837 births
1924 deaths
Progressive Conservative Party of Ontario MPPs